A Christmas Carol; or, Past, Present, and Future is a play in three acts (or ‘Staves’) by Edward Stirling at the Adelphi Theatre in London on 5 February 1844. Containing songs especially written for the show, the drama was adapted from the novella A Christmas Carol by Charles Dickens which had been published just weeks before in December 1843. By February 1844 eight other adaptations had already appeared on the London stage, including A Christmas Carol, or, the Miser's Warning! by C. Z. Barnett, which had opened at the Surrey Theatre in February 1844. Stirling's version, however, was the only production to be sanctioned by Dickens, who gave permission for the adaptation in January 1844.

Later, in his  memoirs, Stirling wrote that Dickens came to several rehearsals during which he made 'valuable suggestions'. Dickens stated in his letters that he went to the Adelphi to see the production but had mixed feelings about it. Stirling revived his production in 1859.

Two woodcuts of scenes from the production, drawing heavily on the original illustrations by John Leech, were published in The Illustrated London News on 17 February 1844.

The critic of The Illustrated London News wrote of the production:
We have already given a slight sketch of this happy dramatic adaptation from Dickens's admirable "romance of real life;" we will now proceed to illustrate it, more through the graphical agency of our artist than by anything we could ourselves indite.  Of the production itself, from which the theatrical representation has emanated, we have nothing to say, but "plaudits" from beginning to end: it exhibits the author not only as a caricaturist, but a philanthropist, a satirist, and, unlike the censors of old, a moralist.  Neither Horace, Juvenal, nor Persius, could "touch the pitch" they wanted to make appear more black, "without defiling their own fingers," but Dickens is never corrupted by his subject; he stands aloof and "shoots Vice as well as Folly" when it obtrudes itself upon his universal surveillance, with--

An arrow shot by Virtue--barb'd by Wit.The Christmas Carol; or, Past, Present, and Future, The Adelphi Theatre Calendar, University of Massachusetts database
 
A review of 10 February 1844, again in The Illustrated London News, stated:
Dickens is a great man — a moral chemist who has analyzed the human heart to a nicety. "Shewing the poison and the honey there."

His "Christmas Carol; or Past, Present, and Future," dramatised by Mr. Stirling in a most sterling manner, from the prose story of the modern Fielding, was produced on last Monday with most decided success. The acting of O. Smith, as old Scrooge, the miser, was, throughout, admirable. Wright as Bob Cratchit, the miser's clerk, presiding over his family party, was exceedingly droll. The story on which the piece is founded is too well known to enter into particulars of it: suffice it to say, that it is one of those home-bred, natural esculents that a true dramatic palate likes to enjoy, and as such, from its enthusiastic reception, will no doubt be universally relished, and ought to correct and improve the taste of those who fly to the Continent ** for what can be so abundantly supplied at home.

Synopsis

Miserly Ebenezer Scrooge is a harsh master to his clerk, Bob Cratchit. Uncaring and unfeeling, Scrooge lives a cold and solitary life mocking those who celebrate Christmas, including his nephew, Fred. On the evening of Christmas Eve Scrooge gets a visit from his long-dead partner, Jacob Marley, who warns him he is on the path to destruction. But visits from three Christmas Spirits may save him from that hellish fate.

Scenes

Stave the First — The First of the Three Spirits
Chamber of Scrooge the Miser 
A Child's Story Book
Home for the Holidays
Fezziwig's Ball

Stave the Second — The Second of the Three Spirits
Scrooge's Chamber - The Dream
Clare Market by Gaslight
Christmas Eve
Bob Cratchit's, Camden Town
Christmas Dinner
The Lighthouse and Open Sea.

Stave the Third — The Last of the Spirits

The Desolate Churchyard 
The Miser's Grave
Scrooge's Home - the Carol
General Invitation to Everybody, and Tiny Tim's Blessing on us All

Cast (1844)

Stave the First — The First of the Three Spirits
 Ebenezer Scrooge, (the Money Lender—a Christmas Hater- a name only GOOD upon ‘Change) - Mr. 0. Smith
 Mister Bob Cratchit ... (a Poor Clerk with Fifteen Shillings a Week and Six Children) ... Edward Richard Wright
 The Ghost of Old Jacob Marley (Dead as a Door Nail) Mr. R. Hughes
 Mr. Fezziwig (a London Trader — “one vast substantial smile” —
oily, rich and jovial) .. Mr. Stephen Smith
 Dr. Dilworth .. (a Pedagogue) .. Mr. Johnson
 Master Scrooge .. (a School Boy) .. Master Lightfoot
 Young Scrooge and Dick Wilkins (Fellow Apprentices) .. Mr. George R. Braid and Mr Leslie
 The Dirty Little Boy from over the Way .. Master Mouncer
 Post Boy .. Mr. Honey
 Fiddler .. Mr. Shaw
 Mrs. Fezziwig (Beaming and Lovable) .. Mrs. Woollidge
 Bella Morton (Scrooge's first, his only love, save gold) .. Miss Sarah Jane Woolgar
 The Ghost of Christmas Past (“it was a Strange Figure — like a Child”) .. Miss Ellen Chaplin
 Little Fan (Scrooge's Sister) .. Miss Mott
 Mary, the Tenant — Sally, the Cook — their Friends, Neighbours, &c

Stave the Second — The Second of the Three Spirits
 Nephew Fred .. Mr. George Maynard 
 Master Peter Cratchit .. Master Brunton
 Master Tom Cratchit.. Master Scott
 Sea Captain .. Mr. Jones 
 Tiny Tim (“alas poor Tiny Tim — he bore a little crutch, & had his limbs supported by an iron frame”) .. Miss Maynard 
 Ignorance .. Mr. Crane
 Want .. Mr. Holmes 
 Mariners .. Messrs. Rough & Rains
 Butchers, Grocers, Ballad Singers, Passengers, Watchmen, Small Purchasers, Visitors, &c
 Mrs. Bob Cratchit (Wife to Mr. Bob — “dressed out but poorly in a twice turned gown, but brave in ribbons”) .. Mrs. Frank Matthews
 Martha Cratchit .. Miss Lee
 Belinda Cratchit .. Miss O. Hicks 
 Sally Cratchit .. Miss Johnson 
 The Ghost of Christmas Present .. Mr. Forman

Stave the Third —- The Last of the Spirits
 Old Joe (a Receiver of Stolen Goods — “a grey-haired rascal nearly 70 years of age”) .. Mr. Sanders
 Mr. Topper and Mr. Floss (Worldly Friends of Old Scrooge) .. Mr. Aldridge and Mr. Freeborn
 Mr. Blink (an Undertaker's Man) .. Mr. Honey
 Mrs. Dibler (a Laundress) .. Mrs. Woollidge
 Mrs. Fred .. Miss Butler
 Sally (a Nurse) .. Miss Wilshire
 Spirit of the Future (a Solemn Phantom, dressed & hooded, coming like a Mist along the ground) .. Mrs. David Lee

Cast (1859)
Ebenezer Scrooge .. Charles Selby
Mister Bob Cratchit .. J. L. Toole
Nephew Fred ..  John Billington
The Ghost of Old Jacob Marley .. Thomas Stuart
Mr. Fezziwig .. Christopher J. Smith
Dr. Dilworth .. Robert Romer
Master Scrooge .. Master Page 
Young Scrooge and Dick Wilkins .. William H. Eburne and Mr. Howard
The Dirty Little Boy from over the Way .. Master George Lupino
Fiddler .. Mr. Buckle
Bella Morton .. Adeline Billington
Little Fan .. Miss Morris
Mrs. Fezziwig .. Louisa Chatterley
The Ghost of Christmas Past .. Kate Kelly
Master Tom Cratchit .. Master Craddock
Master Peter Cratchit .. Miss Stoker
Tiny Tim .. Miss Hamilton 
Ignorance - Vision of Doom .. Master Power
Want - Vision of Doom .. Master Jones
Mariners .. Messrs. Dry & Sims
Mr. Topper and Mr. Floss .. William H. Eburne and Mr. Aldridge
Old Joe .. Robert Romer
Mr. Blink .. A. Powell
Mrs. Bob Cratchit .. Sarah Jane Mellon (née Woolgar)   
Martha Cratchit .. Miss Hayman
Belinda Cratchit .. Miss Craddock
Sally Cratchit .. Miss Taylor
The Ghost of Christmas Present .. Paul Bedford
Sally .. Miss Aldridge
Spirit of the Future .. Mr. Johnson 
Mrs. Fred .. Mrs. Laidlaw
Mrs. Dibler .. Mrs. Stoker

References

Charles Dickens
A Christmas Carol
1844 plays
Plays based on novels
Plays based on works by Charles Dickens
Works based on A Christmas Carol
Plays based on A Christmas Carol